Estelle Guisard Diemer (born 05 April 1989) is a former professional tennis player and tennis coach from the France. On 5 July 2010, she reached her highest WTA singles ranking of 228.

Tennis career
She has won 8 singles and 2 doubles titles on the ITF Women's Circuit. In 2012, Guisard won her singles title in Turin defeating Italianwoman Angelica Moratelli. 

In 2005, she played in the final of the France Junior Fed Cup.

Guisard retirement from tennis in 2015. In 2017 Guisard Working as ASM Belfort tennis coach.

National representation

Junior Fed Cup: 1 (1 loss)

References

1989 births
Living people
French female tennis players
French tennis coaches